This article lists the latest men's squads lists for badminton's 2018 Badminton Asia Team Championships.

Group A
Group A consists of China, 
Hong Kong 
and 
Singapore.

China

Hong Kong

Singapore

Group B
Group B consists of Japan, 
Korea, 
Nepal 
and 
Kazakhstan.

Japan

Korea

Nepal

Kazakhstan

Group C
Group C consists of Chinese Taipei, 
Malaysia, 
Thailand 
and 
Myanmar.

Chinese Taipei

Malaysia

Thailand

Myanmar

Group D
Group D consists of Indonesia, 
India, 
Philippines 
and 
Maldives.

Indonesia

India

Philippines

Maldives

References

2018 Badminton Asia Team Championships